Theridion strepitus is a blind cave spider found only on the Galapagos Islands. It is in the family Theridiidae and does not have eyes.

References
 Peck, S.B. & Shear, W.A. (1987). A new eyeless, stridulating Theridion spider from caves in the Galapagos Islands (Araneae, Theridiidae). Can. Entomol. 119:881-885.

Theridiidae
Cave spiders
Endemic fauna of the Galápagos Islands
Spiders of South America
Spiders described in 1987